Abraxas (variant form  romanized) is a word of mystic meaning in the system of the Gnostic Basilides, being there applied to the "Great Archon", the princeps of the 365 spheres. The word is found in Gnostic texts such as the Holy Book of the Great Invisible Spirit, and also appears in the Greek Magical Papyri. It was engraved on certain antique gemstones, called on that account Abraxas stones, which were used as amulets or charms.

The seven letters spelling its name may represent each of the seven classic planets. The word may be related to Abracadabra, although other explanations exist.

There are similarities and differences between such figures in reports about Basilides's teaching, ancient Gnostic texts, the larger Greco-Roman magical traditions, and modern magical and esoteric writings. Speculations have proliferated on Abraxas in recent centuries, who has been claimed to be both an Egyptian god and a demon.

Etymology 
Gaius Julius Hyginus (Fab. 183) gives Abrax Aslo Therbeeo as names of horses of the sun mentioned by 'Homerus'. The passage is miserably corrupt: but it may not be accidental that the first three syllables make Abraxas.

The proper form of the name is evidently Abrasax, as with the Greek writers, Hippolytus, Epiphanius, Didymus (De Trin. iii. 42), and Theodoret; also Augustine and Praedestinatus; and in nearly all the legends on gems. By a probably euphonic inversion the translator of Irenaeus and the other Latin authors have Abraxas, which is found in the magical papyri, and even, though most sparingly, on engraved stones.

The attempts to discover a derivation for the name, Greek, Hebrew, Coptic, or other, have not been entirely successful:

Egyptian 
 Claudius Salmasius (1588-1653) thought it Egyptian, but never gave the proofs which he promised.
 Samuel Sharpe finds in it an Egyptian invocation to the Godhead, meaning "hurt me not".

Hebrew 
Giuseppe Barzilai goes back for explanation to the first verse of the prayer attributed to Nehunya ben HaKanah, the literal rendering of which is "O [God], with thy mighty right hand deliver the unhappy [people]", forming from the initial and final letters of the words the word Abrakd (pronounced Abrakad), with the meaning "the host of the winged ones", i.e., angels. While this theory can explain the mystic word Abracadabra, the association of this phrase with Abrasax is uncertain.

Greek 
 Wendelin discovers a compound of the initial letters, amounting to 365 in numerical value, of four Hebrew and three Greek words, all written with Greek characters:  ("Father, Son, Spirit, holy; salvation from the cross").
According to a note of Isaac de Beausobre's, Jean Hardouin accepted the first three of these, taking the four others for the initials of the Greek , "saving mankind by the holy cross".

Perhaps the word may be included among those mysterious expressions discussed by Adolf von Harnack, "which belong to no known speech, and by their singular collocation of vowels and consonants give evidence that they belong to some mystic dialect, or take their origin from some supposed divine inspiration".

The Egyptian author of the book De Mysteriis in reply to Porphyry (vii. 4) admits a preference of 'barbarous' to vernacular names in sacred things, urging a peculiar sanctity in the languages of certain nations, as the Egyptians and Assyrians; and Origen (Contra Cels. i. 24) refers to the 'potent names' used by Egyptian sages, Persian Magi, and Indian Brahmins, signifying deities in the several languages.

Sources 
It is uncertain what the actual role and function of Abraxas was in the Basilidian system, as our authorities (see below) often show no direct acquaintance with the doctrines of Basilides himself.

As an Archon 

In the system described by Irenaeus, "the Unbegotten Father" is the progenitor of Nous, and Nous produced Logos, Logos produced Phronesis, Phronesis produced Sophia and Dynamis, Sophia and Dynamis produced principalities, powers, and angels, the last of whom create "the first heaven". They in turn originate a second series, who create a second heaven. The process continues in like manner until 365 heavens are in existence, the angels of the last or visible heaven being the authors of our world. "The ruler" [principem, i.e., probably ton archonta] of the 365 heavens "is Abraxas, and for this reason he contains within himself 365 numbers".

The name occurs in the Refutation of all Heresies (vii. 26) by Hippolytus, who appears in these chapters to have followed the Exegetica of Basilides. After describing the manifestation of the Gospel in the Ogdoad and Hebdomad, he adds that the Basilidians have a long account of the innumerable creations and powers in the several 'stages' of the upper world (diastemata), in which they speak of 365 heavens and say that "their great archon" is Abrasax, because his name contains the number 365, the number of the days in the year; i.e. the sum of the numbers denoted by the Greek letters in ΑΒΡΑΣΑΞ according to the rules of isopsephy is 365:

As a god 
Epiphanius (Haer. 69, 73 f.) appears to follow partly Irenaeus, partly the lost Compendium of Hippolytus. He designates Abraxas more distinctly as "the power above all, and First Principle", "the cause and first archetype" of all things; and mentions that the Basilidians referred to 365 as the number of parts (mele) in the human body, as well as of days in the year.

The author of the appendix to Tertullian De Praescr. Haer. (c. 4), who likewise follows Hippolytus's Compendium, adds some further particulars; that 'Abraxas' gave birth to Mind (nous), the first in the series of primary powers enumerated likewise by Irenaeus and Epiphanius; that the world, as well as the 365 heavens, was created in honour of 'Abraxas'; and that Christ was sent not by the Maker of the world but by 'Abraxas'.

Nothing can be built on the vague allusions of Jerome, according to whom 'Abraxas' meant for Basilides "the greatest God" (De vir. ill. 21), "the highest God" (Dial. adv. Lucif. 23), "the Almighty God" (Comm. in Amos iii. 9), and "the Lord the Creator" (Comm. in Nah. i. 11). The notices in Theodoret (Haer. fab. i. 4), Augustine (Haer. 4), and 'Praedestinatus' (i. 3), have no independent value.

It is evident from these particulars that Abrasax was the name of the first of the 365 Archons, and accordingly stood below Sophia and Dynamis and their progenitors; but his position is not expressly stated, so that the writer of the supplement to Tertullian had some excuse for confusing him with "the Supreme God".

As an Aeon 

With the availability of primary sources, such as those in the Nag Hammadi library, the identity of Abrasax remains unclear. The Holy Book of the Great Invisible Spirit, for instance, refers to Abrasax as an Aeon dwelling with Sophia and other Aeons of the Pleroma in the light of the luminary Eleleth. In several texts, the luminary Eleleth is the last of the luminaries (Spiritual Lights) that come forward, and it is the Aeon Sophia, associated with Eleleth, who encounters darkness and becomes involved in the chain of events that leads to the Demiurge's rule of this world, and the salvage effort that ensues. As such, the role of Aeons of Eleleth, including Abraxas, Sophia, and others, pertains to this outer border of the Pleroma that encounters the ignorance of the world of Lack and interacts to rectify the error of ignorance in the world of materiality.

As a demon 
The Catholic church later deemed Abraxas a pagan god, and ultimately branded him a demon as documented in J. Collin de Plancy's Infernal Dictionary, Abraxas (or Abracax) is labeled the "supreme God" of the Basilidians, whom he describes as "heretics of the second century". He further indicated the Basilidians attributed to Abraxas the rule over "365 skies" and "365 virtues". In a final statement on Basilidians, de Plancy states that their view was that Jesus Christ was merely a "benevolent ghost sent on Earth by Abraxas".

Abraxas stones 
A vast number of engraved stones are in existence, to which the name "Abraxas-stones" has long been given. One particularly fine example was included as part of the Thetford treasure from fourth century Norfolk, England. The subjects are mythological, and chiefly grotesque, with various inscriptions, in which ΑΒΡΑΣΑΞ often occurs, alone or with other words. Sometimes the whole space is taken up with the inscription. In certain obscure magical writings of Egyptian origin ἀβραξάς or ἀβρασάξ is found associated with other names which frequently accompany it on gems; it is also found on the Greek metal tesseræ among other mystic words. The meaning of the legends is seldom intelligible: but some of the gems are amulets; and the same may be the case with nearly all.

The Abrasax-image alone, without external Iconisms, and either without, or but a simple, inscription. The Abrasax-imago proper is usually found with a shield, a sphere or wreath and whip, a sword or sceptre, a cock's head, the body clad with armor, and a serpent's tail. There are, however, innumerable modifications of these figures: Lions', hawks', and eagles' skins, with or without mottos, with or without a trident and star, and with or without reverses.
Abrasax combined with other Gnostic Powers. If, in a single instance, this supreme being was represented in connection with powers of subordinate rank, nothing could have been more natural than to represent it also in combination with its emanations, the seven superior spirits, the thirty Aeons, and the three hundred and sixty-five cosmical Genii; and yet this occurs upon none of the relics as yet discovered, whilst those with Powers not belonging to the Gnostic system are frequently met with.
Abrasax with Jewish symbols. This combination predominates, not indeed with symbolical figures, but in the form of inscriptions, such as: Iao, Eloai, Adonai, Sabaoth, Michael, Gabriel, Uriel, Onoel, Ananoel, Raphael, Japlael, and many others. The name ΙΑΩ, to which ΣΑΒΑΩΘ is sometimes added, is found with this figure even more frequently than ΑΒΡΑΣΑΞ, and they are often combined. Beside an Abrasax figure the following, for instance, is found: ΙΑΩ ΑΒΡΑΣΑΞ ΑΔΩΝ ΑΤΑ, "Iao Abrasax, thou art the Lord". With the Abrasax-shield are also found the divine names Sabaoth Iao, Iao Abrasax, Adonai Abrasax, etc.
Abrasax with Persian deities. Chiefly, perhaps exclusively, in combination with Mithras, and possibly a few specimens with the mystical gradations of mithriaca, upon Gnostic relics.
Abrasax with Egyptian deities. It is represented as a figure, with the sun-god Phre leading his chariot, or standing upon a lion borne by a crocodile; also as a name, in connection with Isis, Phtha, Neith, Athor, Thot, Anubis, Horus, and Harpocrates in a Lotus-leaf; also with a representation of the Nile, the symbol of prolificacy, with Agathodaemon (Chnuphis), or with scarabs, the symbols of the revivifying energies of nature.
Abrasax with Grecian deities, sometimes as a figure, and again with the simple name, in connection with the planets, especially Venus, Hecate, and Zeus, richly engraved.
Simple or ornamental representations of the journey of departed spirits through the starry world to Amenti, borrowed, as those above-named, from the Egyptian religion. The spirit wafted from the earth, either with or without the corpse, and transformed at times into Osiris or Helios, is depicted as riding upon the back of a crocodile, or lion, guided in some instances by Anubis, and other genii, and surrounded by stars; and thus attended hastening to judgment and a higher life.
Representations of the judgment, which, like the preceding, are either ornamental or plain, and imitations of Egyptian art, with slight modifications and prominent symbols, as the vessel in which Anubis weighs the human heart, as comprehending the entire life of man, with all its errors.
Worship and consecrating services were, according to the testimony of Origen in his description of the ophitic diagram, conducted with figurative representations in the secret assemblies of the Gnostics unless indeed the statement on which this opinion rests designates, as it readily may, a statue of glyptic workmanship. It is uncertain if any of the discovered specimens actually represent the Gnostic cultus and religious ceremonies, although upon some may be seen an Abrasax-figure laying its hand upon a person kneeling, as though for baptism or benediction.
Astrological groups. The Gnostics referred everything to astrology. Even the Bardesenists located the inferior powers, the seven, twelve and thirty-six, among the planets, in the zodiac and starry region, as rulers of the celestial phenomena which influence the earth and its inhabitants. Birth and health, wealth and allotment, are considered to be mainly under their control. Other sects betray still stronger partiality for astrological conceits. Many of these specimens also are improperly ascribed to Gnosticism, but the Gnostic origin of others is too manifest to allow of contradiction.
Inscriptions, of which there are three kinds:
Those destitute of symbols or iconisms, engraved upon stone, iron, lead and silver plates, in Greek, Latin, Coptic or other languages, of amuletic import, and in the form of prayers for health and protection.
Those with some symbol, as a serpent in an oval form.
Those with iconisms, at times very small, but often made the prominent object, so that the legend is limited to a single word or name. Sometimes the legends are as important as the images. It is remarkable, however, that thus far none of the plates or medals found seem to have any of the forms or prayers reported by Origen. It is necessary to distinguish those specimens that belong to the proper Gnostic period from such as are indisputably of later origin, especially since there is a strong temptation to place those of more recent date among the older class.

Gallery

Anguipede 

In a great majority of instances the name Abrasax is associated with a singular composite figure, having a Chimera-like appearance somewhat resembling a basilisk or the Greek primordial god Chronos (not to be confused with the Greek titan Cronus). According to E. A. Wallis Budge, "as a Pantheus, i.e. All-God, he appears on the amulets with the head of a cock (Phœbus) or of a lion (Ra or Mithras), the body of a man, and his legs are serpents which terminate in scorpions, types of the Agathodaimon. In his right hand he grasps a club, or a flail, and in his left is a round or oval shield." This form was also referred to as the Anguipede. Budge surmised that Abrasax was "a form of the Adam Kadmon of the Kabbalists and the Primal Man whom God made in His own image".

Some parts at least of the figure mentioned above are solar symbols, and the Basilidian Abrasax is manifestly connected with the sun. J. J. Bellermann has speculated that "the whole represents the Supreme Being, with his Five great Emanations, each one pointed out by means of an expressive emblem. Thus, from the human body, the usual form assigned to the Deity, forasmuch as it is written that God created man in his own image, issue the two supporters, Nous and Logos, symbols of the inner sense and the quickening understanding, as typified by the serpents, for the same reason that had induced the old Greeks to assign this reptile for an attribute to Pallas. His head—a cock's—represents Phronesis, the fowl being emblematical of foresight and vigilance. His two hands bear the badges of Sophia and Dynamis, the shield of Wisdom, and the scourge of Power."

Origin 
In the absence of other evidence to show the origin of these curious relics of antiquity the occurrence of a name known as Basilidian on patristic authority has not unnaturally been taken as a sufficient mark of origin, and the early collectors and critics assumed this whole group to be the work of Gnostics. During the last three centuries attempts have been made to sift away successively those gems that had no claim to be considered in any sense Gnostic, or specially Basilidian, or connected with Abrasax. The subject is one which has exercised the ingenuity of many savants, but it may be said that all the engraved stones fall into three classes:
 Abrasax, or stones of Basilidian origin
 Abrasaxtes, or stones originating in ancient forms of worship and adapted by the Gnostics
 Abraxoïdes, or stones absolutely unconnected with the doctrine of Basilides

While it would be rash to assert positively that no existing gems were the work of Gnostics, there is no valid reason for attributing all of them to such an origin. The fact that the name occurs on these gems in connection with representations of figures with the head of a cock, a lion, or an ass, and the tail of a serpent was formerly taken in the light of what Irenaeus says about the followers of Basilides:

Incantations by mystic names were characteristic of the hybrid Gnosticism planted in Spain and southern Gaul at the end of the fourth century and at the beginning of the fifth, which Jerome connects with Basilides and which (according to his Epist., lxxv.) used the name Abrasax.

It is therefore not unlikely that some Gnostics used amulets, though the confident assertions of modern writers to this effect rest on no authority. Isaac de Beausobre properly calls attention to the significant silence of Clement in the two passages in which he instructs the Christians of Alexandria on the right use of rings and gems, and the figures which may legitimately be engraved on them (Paed. 241 ff.; 287 ff.). But no attempt to identify the figures on existing gems with the personages of Gnostic mythology has had any success, and Abrasax is the only Gnostic term found in the accompanying legends that is not known to belong to other religions or mythologies. The present state of the evidence therefore suggests that their engravers and the Basilidians received the mystic name from a common source now unknown.

Magical papyri 
Having due regard to the magic papyri, in which many of the unintelligible names of the Abrasax-stones reappear, besides directions for making and using gems with similar figures and formulas for magical purposes, it can scarcely be doubted that many of these stones are pagan amulets and instruments of magic.

The magic papyri reflect the same ideas as the Abrasax-gems and often bear Hebraic names of God. The following example is illustrative: "I conjure you by Iaō Sabaōth Adōnai Abrasax, and by the great god, Iaeō". The patriarchs are sometimes addressed as deities; for which fact many instances may be adduced. In the group "Iakoubia, Iaōsabaōth Adōnai Abrasax", the first name seems to be composed of Jacob and Ya. Similarly, entities considered angels in Judaism are invoked as gods alongside Abrasax: thus "I conjure you ... by the god Michaēl, by the god Souriēl, by the god Gabriēl, by the god Raphaēl, by the god Abrasax Ablathanalba Akrammachari ...".

In text PGM V. 96-172, Abrasax is identified as part of the "true name which has been transmitted to the prophets of Israel" of the "Headless One, who created heaven and earth, who created night and day ... Osoronnophris whom none has ever seen ... awesome and invisible god with an empty spirit"; the name also includes Iaō and Adōnai. "Osoronnophris" represents Egyptian Wsir Wn-nfr, "Osiris the Perfect Being". Another identification with Osiris is made in PGM VII. 643-51: "you are not wine, but the guts of Osiris, the guts of ... Ablanathanalba Akrammachamarei Eee, who has been stationed over necessity, Iakoub Ia Iaō Sabaōth Adōnai Abrasax." PGM VIII. 1-63, on the other hand, identifies Abrasax as a name of "Hermes" (i.e. Thoth). Here the numerological properties of the name are invoked, with its seven letters corresponding to the seven planets and its isopsephic value of 365 corresponding to the days of the year. Thoth is also identified with Abrasax in PGM LXXIX. 1-7: "I am the soul of darkness, Abrasax, the eternal one, Michaēl, but my true name is Thōouth, Thōouth."

One papyrus titled the "Monad" or the "Eighth Book of Moses" (PGM XIII. 1–343) contains an invocation to a supreme creator God; Abrasax is given as being the name of this God in the language of the baboons. The papyrus goes on to describe a cosmogonic myth about Abrasax, describing how he created the Ogdoad by laughing. His first laughter created light; his second divided the primordial waters; his third created the mind; his fourth created fertility and procreation; his fifth created fate; his sixth created time (as the sun and moon); and his seventh and final laughter created the soul. Then, from various sounds made by Abrasax, there arose the serpent Python who "foreknew all things", the first man (or Fear), and the god Iaō, "who is lord of all". The man fought with Iaō, and Abrasax declared that Iaō's power would derive from both of the others, and that Iaō would take precedence over all the other gods. This text also describes Helios as an archangel of God/Abrasax.

The Leyden Papyrus recommends that this invocation be pronounced to the moon:

The magic word "Ablanathanalba", which reads in Greek the same backward as forward, also occurs in the Abrasax-stones as well as in the magic papyri. This word is usually conceded to be derived from the Hebrew (Aramaic), meaning "Thou art our father" (אב לן את), and also occurs in connection with Abrasax; the following inscription is found upon a metal plate in the Karlsruhe Museum:

In literature

In popular culture

In the 2022 point n' click videogame The Excavation of Hob's Barrow, by developer Cloak and Dagger Games and published by Wadjet Eye Games, Abraxas is a god/demon closely inspired by the original Gnostic Mythology.
In Marvel comics, the character Abraxas embodies the destruction of the multiverse (first appearance: 2001).
"Mt. Abraxas" is the title of the first track of occult rock band Uncle Acid & the Deadbeats's third studio album Mind Control (2013).
Abraxas appears as a demon in Charmed season 2 (1999–2000).
Abraxas appears as a demon in Supernatural season 14 (2018–2019).
In the 2008 visual novel 11eyes: Tsumi to Batsu to Aganai no Shōjo, Kukuri can summon her soul in the form of a chained guardian angel named Abraxas. When released from his chains, he becomes a godlike entity named Demiurge.
The 2018 video game Darksiders III features a demon named Abraxis.
South Korean band BTS's videos frequently mention Abraxas and much of their storyline is based around the deity. 
In 1970, the second studio album of Latin rock band Santana was named Abraxas, derived from a passage in the Hermann Hesse novel Demian.
In 1987 The Abraxas Foundation was founded by Boyd Rice as a Social Darwinist think tank.
In the 2018 thriller Mandy, the "horn of Abraxas" is a sort of stone flute with magical properties. Brother Swan uses it to summon the Black Skulls, a demonic biker gang.
In the 2019 role-playing game Fire Emblem: Three Houses, Abraxas is the name of a damage-dealing Faith spell.
In the 2010 song "Lead Poisoning" by Alkaline Trio, Matt Skiba sings the line "Now I pray to Abraxas my soul to keep".
In season 1, episode 2 of Netflix's 2020 animated show The Midnight Gospel the main character, Clancy Gilroy, purchases an avatar named Braxis, which he then uses to explore alternate universes. Braxis looks like the traditional images of Abraxas where the creature has a human body and the head of a rooster. Like the traditional images, Braxis has serpents for legs and his arms are also like those in traditional representations.
In the 2018 video game Assassin's Creed Odyssey, Abraxas is the name of the legendary fiery horse the player acquires if they reach the Tier 1 level in the hierarchy of mercenaries.
In J. K. Rowling's Harry Potter series (1997–2007), Abraxas is the name of Lucius Malfoy's father, as well as the name of a race of winged horses in the same fictional world.
In the 2015 sci-fi/action movie Jupiter Ascending, the most powerful family in the Cosmos known as the House of Abrasax.
Abraxas, in the Gnostic role of Great Archon, is the antagonist of the 2021 video game Cruelty Squad.
In the 2021 TV-adaptation of Isaac Asimov's Foundation series, the Abraxas Conjecture is the name of the mathematical proof that Gaal Dornick solves using Kalle's Ninth Proof of Folding.
In Sarah J. Maas' Throne of Glass series (2014–2018), the similarly-named Abraxos is the wyvern mount of Manon Blackbeak.
In the 1992 Discworld novel Small Gods by Terry Pratchett, Abraxas was an Ephebian philosopher who wrote about the nature of gods in his scroll On Religion, theorising that gods died if belief in them is diverted towards a rigid, hierarchical church structure, as had nearly happened with the Great God Om due to fear of the Omnian Quisition. Having survived being struck by lightning fifteen times as a result, he earned the nickname 'Charcoal'.
In the Shin Megami Tensei video game franchise (first release: 1987), Abraxas is a demon.
In the 2020 video game Genshin Impact, Abrax (also known as Aberaku no Mikoto) was a historical figure in Enkanomiya who created the Dainichi Mikoshi, an artificial sun device whose name is described as meaning "chariot of the sun".
In the 1997 animated series Revolutionary Girl Utena by animation studio Be-Papas, Abraxas is referenced in the series soundtrack. The title being; "The God's Name Is Abraxas".
In the 1999 movie Adolescence of Utena by animation studio Be-Papas, Abraxas is referenced in the film's soundtrack. The title of the song being; "Abraxas ~ Sunny Garden".
In 2019, electronic music producers Seven Lions and Dimibo formed a psytrance trio called “Abraxis.” The project consists of a back story in which Reginald Abraxis formed the Abraxis Institute, in order to help people explore their full potential and achieve self-actualization.

See also 
 Arimanius
 Chronos
 Sator Square

References

Citations

Works cited

General references
 
Wendelin, in a letter in 
 
 
 
 
 
Idem, Abraxas in Herzog, RE, 2d ed., 1877.
 
 
 
Idem, Appendice alla dissertazione sugli Abraxas, ib. 1874.
 
 
Harnack, Geschichte, i. 161. The older material is listed by Matter, ut sup., and Wessely, Ephesia grammata, vol. ii., Vienna, 1886.
  Eng. transl., 10 vols., London, 1721–2725.

Attribution

Further reading

External links 
 The complete texts of Carl Jung's "The Seven Sermons To The Dead"
 Abraxas article from The Mystica

Gnostic deities
Magic words
Mythological hybrids
Names of God in Gnosticism
Theophoric names